Broadcasters for the Chicago Bulls National Basketball Association team.

Television

Play-by-play
Jack Brickhouse: 1966–1973 (WGN-TV)
Andy Musser: 1973–1976 (WSNS)
Lorn Brown: 1976–1978 (WGN-TV)
Jack Fleming: 1978–1979 (WGN-TV)
Bob Costas: 1979–1980 (WGN-TV)
Milo Hamilton: 1980–1985 (WGN-TV)
Joe Tait: 1982–1983 (Sportsvision Chicago)
Bill Hazen: 1983–1985 (Sportsvision Chicago)
Jim Durham: 1985–1991 (Sportsvision/SportsChannel Chicago, WFLD, WGN-TV)
Wayne Larrivee: 1991–2008 (WGN-TV, WCIU-TV)
Tom Dore: 1991–2008 (SportsChannel/Fox Sports Net/NBC Sports Chicago)
Neil Funk: 2008–2020 (NBC Sports Chicago, WGN-TV, WCIU-TV, WPWR-TV)
Adam Amin: 2020–present (NBC Sports Chicago)

Color analysts
Vince Lloyd: 1966–1973 (WGN-TV)
Dick Gonski: 1973–1975 (WSNS-TV)
Lorn Brown: 1975–1976 (WSNS-TV)
Johnny “Red” Kerr: 1976–1998, 1999–2008 (Sportsvision/SportsChannel/Fox Sports Net/Comcast SportNet Chicago, WGN-TV, WCIU)
John Mengelt: 1982–1985 (WGN-TV)
John Paxson: 1998–1999 (Fox Sports Net Chicago, WGN-TV)
Stacey King: 2006–Present (NBC Sports Chicago, WGN-TV, WCIU-TV, WPWR-TV)

Broadcast outlets
WGN-TV (1966–1973, 1976–1985, 1989–2019)
WGN America (1978–1985; 1989–2014)†
WSNS-TV (1973–1976)
WFLD (1986–1989)
WCIU-TV (1999–2014)
WPWR-TV (2014–2019)
ONTV/Sportsvision/SportsChannel Chicago/FSN Chicago (1982–2004)
Comcast SportsNet Chicago/NBC Sports Chicago (2004–Present)

†: from 1999 to 2014, WGN America only simulcast approximately half of WGN-TV's annual Bulls schedule.

Radio

Play-by-play
Lou Boudreau: 1966–1968 (WGN)
Vince Lloyd: 1968–1970 (WGN)
Jack Fleming:1970–1973 (WIND)
Jim Durham: 1973–1991 (WIND, WVON, WGCI, WMAQ, WLUP)
John Rooney: 1989–1991 (WLUP)
Neil Funk: 1991–2008 (WMAQ, WMVP, WCKG)
Chuck Swirsky: 2008–present (WMVP, WLS)

Color analysts
Vince Lloyd: 1966–1968 (WGN)
Roy Leonard: 1968–1970 (WGN)
Bill Berg: 1970–1980 (WIND)
Norm Van Lier: 1980–1982 (WVON, WGCI-FM)
Dave Baum: 1982–1985 (WIND)
Johnny “Red” Kerr: 1985–1991, 1998–1999 (WMAQ, WMVP)
Junior Bridgeman:  1989-1990 (WLUP)
Bob Love: 1989–1990 (WLUP)
Tom Boerwinkle: 1990–1994 (WLUP, WMAQ)
Adam Howes: Game 6, 1993 Finals
John Paxson: 1994–1995, 1999–2003 (WMAQ, WMVP)
Harvey Catchings: 1995–1996 (WMAQ)
Derrek Dickey: 1996–1999 (WMVP)
Bill Wennington: 2003–Present (WMVP, WCKG, WLS)

Broadcast outlets
WGN (1966–1970)
WIND (1970–1980, 1982–1985)
WVON (1980–1981)
WGCI-FM (1981–1982)
WMAQ (1985–1988, 1991–1996)
WLUP (1988–1991)
WMVP (1996–2006, 2007–2016)
WCKG (2006–2007)
WLS (2016–2018)
WSCR (2018–Present)

Spanish radio

Play-by-play
John Morales: 1991–1992 (WTAQ)
Hector Molina: 1992–1999 (WIND)
Omar Ramos: 2009–Present (WRTO)

Color analysts
Christian Ramos: 1991–1992 (WTAQ)
Hector Lozano: 1992–1999 (WIND)
Matthew Moreno: 2009–Present (WRTO)

Broadcast outlets
WTAQ (1991–1992)
WIND (1992–1999)
WRTO (2009–Present)

See also
 List of current National Basketball Association broadcasters
 List of Chicago Bears broadcasters
 List of Chicago Blackhawks broadcasters
 List of Chicago Cubs broadcasters
 List of Chicago White Sox broadcasters

References
Chicago Bulls Media Guide

 
SportsChannel
Fox Sports Networks
NBC Sports Regional Networks
Chicago Bulls